The 2020 North Carolina Republican presidential primary took place on March 3, 2020, as one of fourteen contests scheduled for Super Tuesday in the Republican Party presidential primaries for the 2020 presidential election.

Results

Results by county

References 

North Carolina
Republican presidential primary
North Carolina Republican primaries